Donald Burdick (born November 6, 1934) is a retired United States Army major general who served as director of the Army National Guard.

Early life and civilian career
Donald Burdick (no middle name) was born in Queens, New York on November 6, 1934.  He graduated from Rutgers University with a Bachelor of Science degree in Animal Science in 1956, and a Master of Science degree in Animal Nutrition in 1958.  He received his Ph.D. in Biochemistry from The Pennsylvania State University in 1962.

Upon completing his education, Burdick embarked on a 28-year federal civil service career as a research chemist and agronomist, which included research, teaching, and supervisory positions with the United States Department of Agriculture, the University of Kentucky, and the University of Georgia.

Military career
Burdick's 38- year military career began in 1956, when he received his commission as a second lieutenant in the United States Army Reserve through the Reserve Officer Training Corps program at Rutgers.  Qualified first in Armor and later in Field Artillery, he later transferred to the Army National Guard and became a platoon leader with the New Jersey Army National Guard’s 103rd Armor Group.  He subsequently served in various command and staff positions from troop through brigade level in National Guard units in Pennsylvania, Kentucky, and Georgia.

From 1981 to 1983, Burdick commanded the 118th Field Artillery Brigade.  Known as the “Chatham Artillery,” this organization is one of the oldest standing militia units in the nation, with origins dating from 1751.  The Chatham Artillery fired a 26-gun salute for President George Washington when he visited Savannah, Georgia in 1792, landed on Omaha Beach shortly after D-Day  during World War II, and more recently served in the War in Iraq.

In 1983, Governor Joe Frank Harris appointed Burdick as Georgia's Assistant Adjutant General – Army, and he was promoted to brigadier general.

In 1986, Secretary of the Army John O. Marsh nominated Burdick for promotion to major general and assignment as director of the Army National Guard.  As director, he was a member of the Army Staff, and was responsible for plans, programs and policies pertaining to Army National Guard units in the 54 states and territories.  His service as director included overseeing the mobilization of Army National Guard units during Operations Desert Shield and Desert Storm, as well as the fielding of the M1 Abrams Main Battle Tank and the Multiple Launch Rocket System to National Guard units.  He served until 1991, when he returned to Georgia.

Burdick concluded his National Guard career by serving from 1991 to 1994 as a special assistant to the Adjutant General of the Georgia National Guard and the first director of the Georgia Youth ChalleNGe program.  Georgia was one of the original ten states to pilot this community-based, National Guard-sponsored program, which trains, leads, and mentors at-risk youth in a caring yet disciplined environment, encouraging them to overcome the obstacles they face to becoming successful and productive adults.

Military education
Burdick is a graduate of the United States Army Command and General Staff College and the United States Army War College (class of 1981).  He was the first officer from the Georgia Army National Guard to attend the Army War College in residence.

Awards and decorations
Burdick's awards include the  Distinguished Service Medal, Legion of Merit, Meritorious Service Medal with OLC, Army Commendation Medal, Air Force Commendation Medal, Army Reserve Components Achievement Medal (with two OLC), National Defense Service Medal, Armed Forces Reserve Medal (with two Hourglass Devices), and Army Staff Identification Badge.

Additional awards
In 1989, Burdick received an Honorary Doctorate from Vincennes University.

In 1995 Burdick received a state promotion to lieutenant general in recognition of his long service and outstanding performance of duty.

Retirement
In retirement Burdick resides in Hartwell, Georgia, where he has been active in community affairs.  In the late 1990s, he led a local campaign to save a popular state park from closure due to statewide budget cuts. He was subsequently elected to a five-year term as a member of the Hart County Board of Commissioners.  He later served a three-year appointed term as a member and chairman of the county's Board of Tax Assessors.

He is active in civic and service organizations, including the Sons of the American Revolution, where he served as a local chapter president in 2013, Senior Vice President (Georgia Society) in 2017, and State President (Georgia Society) in 2018; and the Sons of Union Veterans of the Civil War.  Burdick is also a participant in the Mission Readiness initiative, an effort to improve the physical, mental and emotional readiness of high school graduates in the United States, so that they are better prepared to enter college, the workforce or the military.

As an active member of the Church of Jesus Christ of Latter-day Saints, Burdick has served in a variety of lay clergy positions, and he and his wife spent the first two years of their retirement as Church Education System missionaries in Georgia and South Carolina.

Family
Burdick traces his lineage back to the first Burdick in North America, Robert Burdick, who immigrated to Rhode Island from England in 1651.  Included within that lineage are a father and son who served in the American Revolution and another ancestor who fought in the Battle of Fredericksburg during the American Civil War.

Burdick's older brother served on active duty at the end of World War II, and completed his career in the National Guard as a Chief Warrant Officer 3.

Burdick is married to the former Nancy Ann Stover from New Brunswick, New Jersey and they are the parents of two sons, David and Daniel, and two daughters, Susan and Amy, and the grandparents of ten.  Burdick's two sons followed him as citizen soldiers.  One served as a field artillery officer in the Utah Army National Guard and for seven years on active duty in Oklahoma and Germany.  The other served for several years as an Apache helicopter pilot on active duty and with the Utah Army National Guard.

Chronological list of assignments
June, 1956 – December, 1956, United States Army Reserve Control Group (Reinforcement) 
December, 1956 – October, 1958, platoon leader, 103rd Armor Group, New Jersey Army National Guard
October, 1958 – October, 1962, platoon leader, 104th Armored Cavalry, Pennsylvania Army National Guard
October, 1962 – April, 1963, platoon leader, 2nd Battalion, 111th Infantry, Pennsylvania Army National Guard 
April, 1963 – May, 1964, troop executive officer, 1st Reconnaissance Squadron, 223rd Cavalry, Pennsylvania Army National Guard 
May, 1964 – October, 1965, troop commander, 1st Squadron, 223rd Cavalry, Pennsylvania Army National Guard 
October, 1965 – November, 1965, intelligence staff officer (S2), 1st Squadron, 223d Cavalry, Pennsylvania Army National Guard 
November, 1965 – October, 1969, assistant intelligence staff officer (assistant S2), later target analyst, XXIII Corps Artillery, Kentucky Army National Guard 
October, 1969 – December, 1971, assistant plans, operations and training staff officer (assistant S3), later plans, operations and training staff officer (S3), 118th Field Artillery Group, Georgia Army National Guard 
December, 1971 – January, 1976, plans, operations and training staff officer (S3), later executive officer, 1st Battalion, 214th Field Artillery, Georgia Army National Guard 
January, 1976 – January, 1979, commander, 1st Battalion, 214th Field Artillery, Georgia Army National Guard 
January, 1979 – July, 1980, chief, plans, operations, and military support, Georgia Army National Guard 
July, 1980 – June, 1981, student, United States Army War College, Carlisle Barracks, Pennsylvania 
June, 1981 – September, 1981, deputy chief of staff, State Headquarters, Georgia Army National Guard 
September, 1981 – November, 1983, commander, 118th Field Artillery Brigade, Georgia Army National Guard 
November, 1983 – March, 1987, assistant adjutant general—Army, Georgia Army National Guard
March, 1987 – June, 1991, director, Army National Guard, National Guard Bureau, Washington, DC
June, 1991 – November, 1994, special assistant to the adjutant general, later director, Youth ChalleNGe Program, Georgia Army National Guard

Effective dates of promotion
Major general, June 1, 1987
Brigadier general, February 29, 1984
Colonel, April 26, 1979
Lieutenant colonel, March 11, 1976
Major, December 5, 1970
Captain, June 16, 1964
First lieutenant, June 5, 1959
Second lieutenant, June 6, 1956

References

1934 births
Living people
People from Queens, New York
People from Hartwell, Georgia
United States Army generals
National Guard (United States) generals
Rutgers University alumni
Eberly College of Science alumni
United States Army Command and General Staff College alumni
United States Army War College alumni
Recipients of the Distinguished Service Medal (US Army)
Recipients of the Legion of Merit